Dave Matthews Band is an American rock band formed in Charlottesville, Virginia in 1991 by singer-songwriter and guitarist Dave Matthews. The band has sold over 31 million albums in the United States, making it one of the top 100 highest-selling music acts of all time. Dave Matthews Band won the 1996 Grammy Award for Best Rock Vocal Performance by a Duo or Group for "So Much to Say" and has been nominated for 13 additional Grammys. The band has received three American Music Awards nominations and six MTV Video Music Awards nominations, but has yet to win an award at either ceremony. Overall, Dave Matthews Band has received six awards from 28 nominations.

In 2019 Dave Matthews Band was nominated for induction into the Rock and Roll Hall of Fame. Though receiving the most popular votes, the band was not inducted.

American Music Awards
The American Music Awards is an annual awards ceremony created by Dick Clark in 1973. Dave Matthews Band has received three nominations.

|-
|  || Dave Matthews Band || Favorite Pop/Rock Band/Duo/Group || 
|-
|rowspan="2"|  || Dave Matthews Band || Favorite Pop/Rock Band/Duo/Group || 
|-
| Everyday || Favorite Pop/Rock Album ||

Grammy Awards
The Grammy Awards are awarded annually by the National Academy of Recording Arts and Sciences of the United States. Dave Matthews Band has received one award from fourteen nominations.

|-
|rowspan="2"|  ||rowspan="2"| "What Would You Say" || Best Rock Vocal Performance by a Duo or Group || 
|-
| Best Music Video, Short Form || 
|-
|rowspan="3"|  || "So Much to Say" || Best Rock Vocal Performance by a Duo or Group || 
|-
| "Too Much" || Best Rock Song || 
|-
| Crash || Best Rock Album || 
|-
|rowspan="2"|  ||rowspan="2"| "Crash Into Me" || Best Rock Vocal Performance by a Duo or Group || 
|-
| Best Rock Song || 
|-
|rowspan="2"|  || "Crush" || Best Pop Performance by a Duo or Group with Vocal || 
|-
| Before These Crowded Streets || Best Rock Album || 
|-
|  || "Love of My Life" with Santana || Best Pop Collaboration with Vocals || 
|-
|  || "The Space Between" ||  Best Rock Vocal Performance by a Duo or Group || 
|-
|  || "Where Are You Going" ||  Best Pop Performance by a Duo or Group with Vocal || 
|-
|rowspan="2"|  ||rowspan="2"| Big Whiskey and the GrooGrux King || Best Rock Album || 
|-
|Album of the Year ||

MTV Video Music Awards
The MTV Video Music Awards is an annual awards ceremony established in 1984 by MTV. Dave Matthews Band has received six nominations.

|-
|rowspan="2"|  ||rowspan="2"| "Crash Into Me" || Best Group Video || 
|-
| Best Rock Video || 
|-
|rowspan="2"|  ||rowspan="2"| "Don't Drink the Water" || Best Rock Video || 
|-
| Best Cinematography || 
|-
|  || "I Did It" || Best Group Video || 
|-
|  || "Everyday" || Best Group Video ||

VH1 Music Awards
The  VH1 Music Awards was a short-lived annual awards ceremony established by the VH1 music channel. Dave Matthews Band has received four awards from four nominations.

|-
| 2000 ||Dave Matthews Band  ||  Favorite Group|| 
|-
|rowspan="3"| 2001 || "The Space Between" || Damn I Wish I Wrote That || 
|-
| Everyday || Must-Have Album || 
|-
| Dave Matthews Band || Favorite Group ||

NAACP Image Awards
The NAACP Image Awards are presented annually by the American National Association for the Advancement of Colored People. Dave Matthews Band has received one award.

|-
| 2004 || Dave Matthews Band || Chairman's Award ||

References

External links
 Dave Matthews Band official website

Awards
Lists of awards received by American musician
Lists of awards received by musical group